Namiella is a genus of ascidian tunicates in the family Molgulidae.

Species within the genus Namiella include:
 Namiella bistigmata Monniot & Monniot, 1968

References

Stolidobranchia
Tunicate genera